Tigrioides leucanioides is a moth in the family Erebidae. It was described by Francis Walker in 1862. It is found in southern Myanmar and on Peninsular Malaysia, Sumatra and Borneo. The habitat consists of lower montane forests and lowland forests, including alluvial forests.

The forewings are straw with blackish lines.

References

Moths described in 1862
Lithosiina